Rajya Sabha elections were held on various dates in 1961, to elect members of the Rajya Sabha, Indian Parliament's upper chamber.

Elections
Elections were held to elect members from various states.

Members elected
The following members are elected in the elections held in 1961. They are members for the term 1961-1967 and retire in year 1967, except in case of the resignation or death before the term.
The list is incomplete.

State - Member - Party

Bye-elections
The following bye elections were held in the year 1961.

State - Member - Party

 Mysore - M Sherkhan - INC ( ele  09/03/1961 term till 1964 )
 Uttar Pradesh - Uma Shankar Dikshit - INC ( ele  26/04/1961 term till 1964 )
 Uttar Pradesh - A C Gilbert - INC  ( ele  27/04/1961 term till 1962 )
 Uttar Pradesh - Shanti Devi - OTH  ( ele  27/04/1961 term till 1962 )
 Jammu & Kashmir - Haqim Ali Khawja - OTH ( ele  22/08/1961 term till 1962 )
 Madhya Pradesh  - P C Sethi  - INC ( ele  29/08/1961 term till 1964 )
 Orissa - Dhananjoy Mohanty  - INC ( ele  22/08/1961 term till 1964 )
 Orissa - Bhabani Charan Pattanayak - INC ( ele  29/08/1961 term till 1966 )
 Bihar - Mohammad Chaudhary A - INC ( ele  22/09/1961 term till 1964 )
 West Bengal - M Ishaque  - INC ( ele  29/12/1961 term till 1964 )

References

1961 elections in India
1961